Ministry of Public Health and Population is a governmental ministry of Yemen. It covers public health and demographics.

List of ministers 

 Qassem Mohamad Bahaibah (18 December 2020– )
 Naser Mohsen Ba'aum, (14 September 2015 – 17 December 2020)
 Reyad Yassin Abdulla ( 8 November 2014 – 14 September 2015)

References

External links
 Ministry of Public Health and Population
 Ministry of Public Health and Population 

Government ministries of Yemen
Yemen